Viktor Viktorovich Isaychenko (born 8 February 1976) is a former Russian professional football player.

Club career
He played 7 seasons in the Russian Football National League for 4 different teams.

References

External links
 

1976 births
Living people
Russian footballers
Association football defenders
FC Tom Tomsk players
FC Dynamo Barnaul players
FC Zvezda Irkutsk players
FC Novokuznetsk players
FC Spartak Nizhny Novgorod players